Lukáš Cikánek (born January 9, 1988) is a Czech professional ice hockey goaltender currently playing for Orli Znojmo, a Czech-based team in the Austrian Hockey League, the top tier league in Austria. Previously, he played five seasons with HC Kladno in the Czech Extraliga.

References

External links

1988 births
Czech ice hockey goaltenders
Rytíři Kladno players
Living people
Orli Znojmo players
Sportspeople from Kladno
HC Nové Zámky players
HC Berounští Medvědi players
Piráti Chomutov players
Czech expatriate ice hockey players in Slovakia